Army Navy is the self-titled debut studio album by American indie rock band Army Navy, released on August 27, 2008 on the band's label, The Fever Zone. Two singles were spawned from the album, "My Thin Sides" and "Saints", as well as the music videos for them. "Slight of Hand" and the non-album single "Silvery Sleds" appeared in the 2008 film Nick & Norah's Infinite Playlist, while the band's cover of Maxine Nightingale's "Right Back Where We Started From" was used in the Shrek Forever After teaser trailer and in the trailer for Parental Guidance.

The album was met with positive reviews from music critics, earning 7.8 out of 10 from Pitchfork Media and 7.9 from AbsolutePunk.

Track listing

Personnel 
 Justin Kennedy - lead vocals, guitar
 Louie Schultz - lead guitar, vocals
 Douglas Randall - drums, vocals

References

External links 
 Army Navy on iTunes
 
 

2008 albums